Eugauria is a genus of moths of the family Crambidae. It contains only one species, Eugauria albidentata, which is found on Java.

References

Musotiminae
Crambidae genera
Taxa named by Edward Meyrick